Hamana (AO-411) was the only ship of her type in the Japanese Maritime Self-Defense Force. She was commissioned on 10 March 1962. She was succeeded by JS Sagami.

Construction and career
She was laid down on 17 April 1961 and launched on 24 October 1961. Commissioned on 10 March 1962 with the hull number AOE-421. Decommissioned on 24 March 1987.

Gallery

References

External links

Auxiliary ships of the Japan Maritime Self-Defense Force
Ships built by Hitachi Zosen Corporation
1961 ships